Hepworth United Ladies Football Club is an English women's football club based in Hepworth, West Yorkshire. The club currently play in the North East Regional Women's League.

History

Season by season record

References

Women's football clubs in England
Sheffield & Hallamshire County FA members